APQ may refer to:

 American Philosophical Quarterly, a scholarly journal
APQ (album), an album by the Art Pepper Quartet

See also 
 apq, an ISO code for the A-Pucikwar language